Psychiatric News is the official newspaper of the American Psychiatric Association (APA).

Description
The newspaper says it "is intended to provide the primary and most trusted information for APA members, other physicians and health professionals, and the public about developments in the field of psychiatry that impact clinical care and professional practice." It reports clinical and research news about psychiatry, medicine, and biobehavioral sciences. Psychiatric News also describes APA's policies, programs, and actions.

The New York Times has cited Psychiatric News variously as "the trade paper", "the journal of the American Psychiatric Association", "the newsletter of the American Psychiatric Association", "published by the American Psychiatric Association", and "meant for professional readers".

History
The pilot issue was published in September 1965 with Robert L. Robinson as editor-in-chief. The newspaper was published monthly through 1969, twice monthly from 1970 through November 2020, and has been appearing monthly again since December 2020.

References

External links
 

Magazines established in 1965
Medical magazines
Monthly magazines
English-language magazines